The Benson Murder Case is a 1930 American pre-Code crime film directed by Frank Tuttle and written by S. S. Van Dine and Bartlett Cormack. The film stars William Powell, William "Stage" Boyd, Eugene Pallette, Paul Lukas, Natalie Moorhead, Richard Tucker and May Beatty. The film was released on April 13, 1930, by Paramount Pictures.

Plot
A ruthless, crooked stockbroker is murdered at his luxurious country estate, and detective Philo Vance just happens to be there; he decides to find out who killed him.

Cast 
William Powell as Philo Vance
William "Stage" Boyd as Harry Gray 
Eugene Pallette as Sgt. Ernest Heath
Paul Lukas	as Adolph Mohler
Natalie Moorhead as Fanny Del Roy
Richard Tucker as Anthony Benson
May Beatty	as Mrs. Paula Banning
E.H. Calvert as Dist. Atty. John F.X. Markham
Mischa Auer as Albert Brecker (uncredited)
Guy Oliver as Captain Hagedorn (uncredited)

References

External links 
 
 Stills from the Spanish-language version of the film. El cuerpo del delito, WalterFilm Poster and Photo Museum

1930 films
1930s English-language films
American crime films
1930 crime films
Paramount Pictures films
Films directed by Frank Tuttle
American black-and-white films
1930s American films
Philo Vance films